The Providence blue pigeon (Alectroenas sp.), also known as the Farquhar Islands blue pigeon or small blue pigeon is an extinct species of bird that lived on Farquhar, Providence, and St. Pierre in the Seychelles.

Description
The Providence blue pigeon was a species of blue pigeon that most likely looked very similar to the Seychelles blue pigeon. It may even have been the same species as the Seychelles blue pigeon, although it is more likely that it was its own species. It nested on Mapou trees and other similar trees. In 1821–1822 it was said that they were in great abundance in Farquhar.

History
In an excerpt from a document from Fairfax Moresby, he mentions "small blue pigeons", of which today none are known to inhabit the island.

In 1968, David Stoddart surveyed Farquhar but did not sight any blue pigeon species. It is unknown what drove them to extinction.

References

sp.
Extinct birds
Taxobox binomials not recognized by IUCN